Hakea microcarpa , commonly known as small-fruit hakea is a flowering plant in the family Proteaceae and is endemic to eastern Australia. It is a spreading shrub, often growing in woodlands, heathlands and near swamps in montane areas of eastern Australia.

Description
Its leaves and branches are glabrous except for a few hairs on new growth and which are lost by the time of flowering. The flowers are off-white in colour and are arranged in groups of ten to forty in the leaf axils. Flowering occurs from September to February and is followed by the fruit which is a woody follicle containing two winged seeds.

Taxonomy and naming
Hakea microcarpa was first formally described in 1810 by Robert Brown and the description was published in Transactions of the Linnean Society of London. The specific epithet (microcarpa) is a derived from the ancient Greek words mikros (μικρός)  meaning "small" and karpos (καρπός) meaning "fruit", referring to the small fruit.

Distribution and habitat
Small-fruited hakea grows on the east coast and ranges of Australia from Stanthorpe to Tasmania where it grows in subalpine bogs, or in forest or woodland in damp sites.

References

microcarpa
Flora of New South Wales
Flora of Queensland
Flora of Tasmania
Flora of Victoria (Australia)
Proteales of Australia
Plants described in 1810
Taxa named by Robert Brown (botanist, born 1773)